Gerald Robinson (born September 15, 1984) is an American-Dutch professional basketball player, who has played for multiple professional teams in Europe. 
The 230 lb, 6 ft 9 power forward attended University of Tennessee at Martin, and started  his career in the Spanish LEB Bronze league with Oviedo CB and later Cantabria Baloncesto. Later on Robinson played for teams in Iceland, the Netherlands and Cyprus. Robinson also played for the Dutch National team.

Playing career
Robinson spent the 2010–2011 season with Haukar where he averaged 20.6 points and league leading 13.6 rebounds during the regular season. In January 2014, he signed with Höttur of the Höttur where he averaged 21.9 points and 9.6 rebounds during the regular season and playoffs.

Robinson spent the 2017–2018 season with the Surrey Scorchers of the British Basketball League, averaging 13.8 points and 6.1 rebounds.

In June, 2018, Robinson signed with Njarðvík of the Úrvalsdeild karla. He was released by Njarðvík on 27 September 2018 prior to the start of the season. In October he signed with ÍR. In 22 regular season games, Robinson averaged 18.3 points and team leading 9.5 rebounds per game. On April 1, 2019, he helped ÍR to victory in game 5 of its first-round playoff series against second seeded Njarðvík. With the victory, ÍR became the third team in the Úrvalsdeild history to come back from a 0–2 deficit and win a best-of-five series. On April 19, he scored 22 points in ÍR's game 5 victory against top seeded Stjarnan, helping ÍR to the Úrvalsdeild finals.

On August 25, 2019, Robinson signed with Haukar with whom he previously played during the 2010–11 Úrvalsdeild season.

On 4 August 2020, Robinson signed with 1. deild karla club Sindri Höfn. In 19 games, he averaged 22.3 points and 10.1 rebounds per game for Sindri which finished with the third best record in the league.

In July 2021, Robinson signed with rival 1. deild club  Körfuknattleiksfélag Selfoss. During his first season with the club, he averaged 24.2 points and 12.6 rebounds per game.

References

External links
Profile at Eurobasket.com  
Profile at RealGM.com
Icelandic statistics at kki.is

1984 births
Living people
African-American basketball players
Apollo Amsterdam players
BSW (basketball club) players
Dutch men's basketball players
American expatriate basketball people in Iceland
American expatriate basketball people in the United Kingdom
American men's basketball players
Basketball players from California
Basketball players from Memphis, Tennessee
British Basketball League players
Cheshire Phoenix players
Dutch Basketball League players
Gerald Robinson
Gerald Robinson
Gerald Robinson
Junior college men's basketball players in the United States
Landstede Hammers players
Oviedo CB players
Plymouth Raiders players
Power forwards (basketball)
Sindri men's basketball players
Small forwards
UT Martin Skyhawks men's basketball players
Gerald Robinson
21st-century African-American sportspeople
20th-century African-American sportspeople
American expatriate basketball people in the Netherlands
American expatriate basketball people in Spain
American expatriate basketball people in Cyprus
American expatriate basketball people in Bolivia
American expatriate basketball people in France